The Orthodox Anglican Communion (OAC) is a communion of churches established in 1964 or 1967, by James Parker Dees. The AOC was formed outside of the See of Canterbury; the OAC is not part of the Anglican Communion. The Anglican Orthodox Communion adheres to the doctrine, discipline and worship contained in the 1662 Book of Common Prayer and the 1562 Articles of Religion.

The OAC was created as a conservative alternative to the mainstream Anglican Communion.

The presiding bishop of the Orthodox Anglican Church serves as metropolitan of the OAC.

The OAC claims to have "over one million lay members".

Orthodox Anglican Church
The Orthodox Anglican Church is a member of the Orthodox Anglican Communion. It was founded as the Anglican Orthodox Church in 1963 or 1964 by James Parker Dees, in Statesville, North Carolina.

James Parker Dees died in 1990. Dees was succeeded as leader by George Schneller; Schneller resigned soon after due to illnesses. The leader thus became Robert J. Godfrey. In 2000, Godfrey resigned; Scott McLaughlin succeeded him as leader. McLaughlin was followed by Creighton Jones. Thomas Gordon is the current leader.

In 1999, the group changed its name to Episcopal Orthodox Christian Archdiocese of America. It then changed it to Orthodox Anglican Church in 2005.

The organisation "champions the 1928 Book of Common Prayer, emphasizes Christian orthodoxy, and insists on high moral standards".

Godfrey and McLaughlin were signatories to the Bartonville Agreement in 1999.

See also 

 Traditional Anglican Church

References

External links
Official website
 

Continuing Anglican denominations
Christian organizations established in 1967